The Hotel Bossert is a historic hotel in Brooklyn, New York. Opened in 1909, it was bought by the Jehovah's Witnesses in 1983 and used by them until 2012, when it was sold for conversion back to a hotel. The conversion work has stalled multiple times since then. The Bossert was once known as "the Waldorf-Astoria of Brooklyn". It was the site of the celebration of the Brooklyn Dodgers' only World Series championship.

History

Early years
The hotel was built in 1909 by Louis Bossert, a Brooklyn lumber magnate, at 98 Montague Street in Brooklyn Heights. It had an Italian Renaissance Revival-style exterior. It was designed as an apartment hotel.   The architects were Helmle & Huberty.

During the 1920s, the Hotel Bossert was known for its Marine Roof, a two-level restaurant on the roof of the 14-story building that provided diners with a commanding view of Manhattan. Popular bandleader Freddy Martin initially gained popularity through a lengthy stint performing at the Marine Roof in the early 1930s. Some of his earliest commercial recordings, which pioneered the 'tenor band' style of sweet dance music, were credited only as the 'Hotel Bossert Orchestra'.

The hotel drew some attention in November, 1945, when Charles Armijo Woodruff, the 11th Governor of American Samoa, committed suicide by hanging himself in his room there.  Just one month later, former Congressman Thomas F. Magner also died in the hotel.

In the 1950s, the Bossert was the home of several Brooklyn Dodger players. Following the Brooklyn Dodgers' win over the New York Yankees in the 1955 World Series, Dodgers fans gathered in the Bossert lobby and serenaded Dodgers' manager Walter Alston with "For He's a Jolly Good Fellow".

Purchase by Watchtower and restoration
In 1983, the Watchtower Bible and Tract Society of New York began leasing space in the Bossert for use by Jehovah's Witnesses. The Society bought the hotel in 1988. It required extensive restoration according to the Landmarks Preservation Commission standards for the historic district. The famed Marine Roof had collapsed, and a new roof had to be built. Watchtower went to the original quarry to replace it. That effort garnered praise and awards. 

In late January 2008, the Society announced it would sell the building. The sale was conducted through a private-bidding process, which took nearly five years. One local realtor (Arlene Waye of Awaye Realty) estimated that the building would sell for about $100 million. Judi Stanton, the president of the Brooklyn Heights Association, remarked that “The Witnesses have done an exquisite job in maintaining the building." Timothy King, a senior partner at Massey Knakal Realty Services Brooklyn, agreed calling the hotel "one of the most unique and most well-maintained trophy assets in Brooklyn."  He continued, "The Watchtower organization is well known for impeccable maintenance standards and the Bossert reflects this level of care. It will be a challenge for a new owner to run the building with the same level of care and attention to detail."

Late in 2012, the Bossert was sold for $81 million to David Bistricer of Clipper Equity and Joseph Chetrit of the Chetrit Group, who planned to turn it into a boutique hotel with around 300 rooms. Multiple announced opening dates have come and gone since then. In May 2022, it was reported that the structure faced foreclosure, after the Chetrit Group defaulted on a $112 million mortgage. In September 2022, it was reported that the vacant hotel had been foreclosed and would be auctioned.

Barbara Cooney was born in the hotel, which was built by her maternal grandfather.

References

Hotels in Brooklyn
Italian Renaissance Revival architecture in the United States
Brooklyn Heights
Hotels established in 1909
Hotel buildings completed in 1909